The Federation of the Left (FdS) was an electoral alliance of communist political parties in Italy. The coalition was the evolution of the Anticapitalist and Communist List.

History
At the start, in May 2009, the federation included four distinct groups:
Communist Refoundation Party (PRC, communist, leader: Paolo Ferrero)
Party of Italian Communists (PdCI, communist, leader: Oliviero Diliberto)
Socialism 2000 (democratic-socialist, leader: Cesare Salvi)
Labour–Solidarity (socialist, leader: Gian Paolo Patta)

In the 2009 European Parliament election the list won 3.4% of the vote. Its strongholds were in Central and Southern Italy: Calabria (6.7%), Umbria (6.2%), Tuscany (5.1%), Basilicata (4.5%), Abruzzo (4.3%) and Marche (4.2%). The support for FdS followed a similar pattern in the 2010 regional elections, despite losing votes to Left Ecology Freedom.

The coalition held its first congress on 20–21 November 2010.

In September 2012 Socialism 2000 and Labour–Solidarity were merged into the Labour Party.

In November 2012 the FdS was de facto suspended as its two main constituents, the PRC and the PdCI, did not agree on how to participate to the 2013 general election, and the PdCI chose to take part to the primary election organized by Italy. Common Good.

In December 2012, la the PRC and the PdCI support list Ingroia "Civil Revolution" to create a fourth pole and a new hope.

Election results

European Parliament

Regional councils

Leadership 
Spokesmen were Paolo Ferrero (2009–2010), Cesare Salvi (2010), Oliviero Diliberto (2010–2011) and Massimo Rossi (2011–2012).

References

Defunct political party alliances in Italy
History of the Communist Refoundation Party